Amelia is a typeface designed by Stan Davis in 1967 and named for his newborn daughter. Its design superficially resembles MICR symbols. Amelia is used in the Moon Boot logo as well as the title artwork for the film Yellow Submarine.

References 

Display typefaces